Forensic Files II is an American true crime documentary series broadcast by HLN. It is a revival of Forensic Files, which originally aired from 1996 to 2011 on various networks, and had extensively aired in reruns by HLN.

The series has been promoted as a reboot of the franchise to differentiate them from the original series, with Bill Camp succeeding Peter Thomas (who died in 2016) as its narrator.

The series premiered on February 23, 2020, with a 16-episode first season. On May 12, 2020, the series was renewed for a second and third season. The second season premiered on July 11, 2021, followed by the third on February 27, 2022.

Development
The last episode of the original Forensic Files series ("Expert Witness") originally aired on June 17, 2011. After the 2016 death of Forensic Files narrator Peter Thomas, the show's executive producer Paul Dowling ruled out the possibility of reviving the series, as he considered Thomas to be "irreplaceable". In October 2019, it was announced that the show would be revived with new episodes to air first-run on HLN in early 2020, with Bill Camp later announced as the new narrator.

Production 
The revival was clarified as being the first season of a new show, rather than the 15th season of Forensic Files, explained by series producer Nancy Duffy as having been done to "differentiate the new episodes from those that came before". Duffy explained: "When we talked about bringing back Forensic Files, a lot of people thought we just meant that we were gonna be [airing] old shows that we didn't previously air on HLN and there seemed to be a confusion about that, so [we changed the title so] there could be no confusion." Series creator Paul Dowling confirmed on Twitter that Forensic Files II was a new, separate show from the original Forensic Files.

Event reenactments
Unlike in the original Forensic Files program, actors were not hired to participate in reenactments of the cases dramatized in Forensic Files II. Instead, various employees of CNN and HLN were utilized to portray victims, suspects, and other individuals for dramatic recreations of real life events. Series producer Nancy Duffy explained that the reenactments are filmed in a more "impressionistic" way than in the original series, so that the individuals used in the recreations "don't have to look identical" to the people they are portraying. As a result, faces are not shown in the recreations in the first season, only bodies from the neck down. The second season occasionally shows faces similar to the people involved in the depicted events with the camera out of focus. Duffy elaborated that employees would approach her and ask to participate in the reenactments, saying that many were "excited" at the prospect of portraying individuals involved in killing, hiding, kidnapping, or the use of physical restraint.

Episodes

Series overview

Season 1 (2020)
The series premiere began with two back-to-back new episodes on February 23, 2020 beginning at 10:00 p.m. Eastern time. Two new episodes aired back-to-back each Sunday, with the final episode of the first season airing on April 12, Easter Sunday.

Season 2 (2021)
Like the first season, this season will begin with two back-to-back new episodes on July 11, 2021 beginning at 10:00 p.m. Eastern time.

Season 3 (2022)
This season began with two back-to-back new episodes on February 27, 2022 beginning at 10:00 p.m. Eastern time. After a five month hiatus, the season resumed with two back-to-back new episodes on July 31, 2022 beginning at 10:00 p.m. Eastern time.

References

External links

2020 American television series debuts
2020s American crime television series
2020s American documentary television series
CNN Headline News original programming
English-language television shows
Forensic Files
Law enforcement in the United States
True crime television series
Television series reboots